John Wesley Clark (October 25, 1830 – August 4, 1898) was an American soldier who fought in the American Civil War. Clark received the country's highest award for bravery during combat, the Medal of Honor, for his action near Warrenton in Virginia on 28 July 1863. He was honored with the award on 21 December 1892.

Biography
Clark was born in Moretown, Vermont on 25 October 1830. He was appointed as regimental quartermaster (with rank of first lieutenant) of the 6th Vermont Infantry in September 1861. He was promoted to captain in April 1864, and resigned from the army by the end of the year. Clark died on 4 August 1898 and his remains are interred at Green Mount Cemetery in Montpelier, Vermont.

Medal of Honor citation

See also

List of American Civil War Medal of Honor recipients: A–F

References

1830 births
1898 deaths
People of Pennsylvania in the American Civil War
Union Army officers
United States Army Medal of Honor recipients
American Civil War recipients of the Medal of Honor
Burials at Green Mount Cemetery (Montpelier, Vermont)